Le Bourgmestre de Furnes is a Belgian novel by Georges Simenon. It was first published in 1939.

1939 Belgian novels
Novels by Georges Simenon
French-language novels